Xanthoparmelia ajoensis is a foliose lichen that belongs to the genus Xanthoparmelia. The lichen is uncommon and is listed as vulnerable by the Nature Conservatory.

Description 
Xanthoparmelia ajoensis grows to around 2–6 cm in diameter with irregularly lobate lobes which are approximately 1–3 mm wide. The upper surface of the lichen is yellow-green on the surface and pale brown to brown on the underside.

Habitat and range 
Xanthoparmelia ajoensis is found in the North American southwest including the US states of Arizona, California, Colorado, and New Mexico and the Mexican states of Sinaloa and Sonora.

Chemistry 
Xanthoparmelia ajoensis has been recorded as containing usnic acid and 3-α-hydroxybarbatic acids.

See also 

 List of Xanthoparmelia species

References 

ajoensis
Lichen species
Lichens of North America
Taxa named by Thomas Hawkes Nash III
Lichens described in 1974